José Mari Uhler Vélez (May 27, 1942 – June 3, 1991) was a Filipino lawyer, journalist, business executive, and activist best remembered for his long career as television newscaster anchoring The Big News on ABC-5 and for his service as an oppositionist delegate to the Philippine Constitutional Convention of 1971. He was one of the opposition delegates at the convention, which was why he was one of the first to be arrested when Ferdinand Marcos declared Martial law in September 1972. In April 1989, Velez became one of the first recipients of the Ninoy Aquino Fellowship Award for his accomplishments in journalism, with President Corazon Aquino stating that she believes he "share[s] in Ninoy's vision of preserving and strengthening our democracy."

Vélez died on June 3, 1991, at Mt. Sinai Hospital in New York City after battling lung cancer. He was a graduate of the University of the Philippines Diliman and of the Center for Research and Communication, which eventually evolved into the University of Asia and the Pacific.

References

University of Asia and the Pacific alumni
Individuals honored at the Bantayog ng mga Bayani
1942 births
1991 deaths
20th-century Filipino businesspeople
News5 people
Marcos martial law victims
Journalists honored at the Bantayog ng mga Bayani